Turua is a small village community on the banks of the Waihou River in the Hauraki Plains in the North Island of New Zealand. It is located close to the mouth of the river, 9 kilometres south of the Firth of Thames and 12 km south of Thames. It is connected by road (Hauraki Road) to SH 25 in the north and SH 2 to the south.

Turua is a Māori place name meaning "twice seen," referring to reflections in the river. Before European settlement, the town site was a Māori pā surrounded by vast forests of kahikatea that came to be known as the "Turua Woods." In the late 19th century  the village of Turua became one of the most important sites of kahikatea exploitation in New Zealand when the family of George and Martha Bagnall bought the Turua sawmill in 1875. Over the next forty years the stands of kahikatea surrounding the town were replaced by small family farms.

Demographics
It is part of the wider Hauraki Plains East statistical area.

Turua had a population of 381 at the 2018 New Zealand census, an increase of 3 people (0.8%) since the 2013 census, and unchanged since the 2006 census. There were 153 households, comprising 183 males and 198 females, giving a sex ratio of 0.92 males per female, with 75 people (19.7%) aged under 15 years, 60 (15.7%) aged 15 to 29, 168 (44.1%) aged 30 to 64, and 81 (21.3%) aged 65 or older.

Ethnicities were 87.4% European/Pākehā, 19.7% Māori, 1.6% Pacific peoples, 3.1% Asian, and 1.6% other ethnicities. People may identify with more than one ethnicity.

Although some people chose not to answer the census's question about religious affiliation, 63.0% had no religion, 25.2% were Christian, 1.6% had Māori religious beliefs, 0.8% were Hindu, 1.6% were Buddhist and 3.9% had other religions.

Of those at least 15 years old, 15 (4.9%) people had a bachelor's or higher degree, and 93 (30.4%) people had no formal qualifications. 36 people (11.8%) earned over $70,000 compared to 17.2% nationally. The employment status of those at least 15 was that 144 (47.1%) people were employed full-time, 39 (12.7%) were part-time, and 15 (4.9%) were unemployed.

Hauraki Plains East

Hauraki Plains East had a population of 1,365 at the 2018 New Zealand census, an increase of 48 people (3.6%) since the 2013 census, and an increase of 27 people (2.0%) since the 2006 census. There were 495 households, comprising 681 males and 684 females, giving a sex ratio of 1.0 males per female. The median age was 40.3 years (compared with 37.4 years nationally), with 297 people (21.8%) aged under 15 years, 225 (16.5%) aged 15 to 29, 648 (47.5%) aged 30 to 64, and 198 (14.5%) aged 65 or older.

Ethnicities were 90.3% European/Pākehā, 16.5% Māori, 0.9% Pacific peoples, 2.6% Asian, and 1.5% other ethnicities. People may identify with more than one ethnicity.

The percentage of people born overseas was 9.9, compared with 27.1% nationally.

Although some people chose not to answer the census's question about religious affiliation, 61.3% had no religion, 26.6% were Christian, 0.9% had Māori religious beliefs, 0.7% were Hindu, 0.4% were Buddhist and 2.0% had other religions.

Of those at least 15 years old, 114 (10.7%) people had a bachelor's or higher degree, and 282 (26.4%) people had no formal qualifications. The median income was $33,000, compared with $31,800 nationally. 147 people (13.8%) earned over $70,000 compared to 17.2% nationally. The employment status of those at least 15 was that 570 (53.4%) people were employed full-time, 162 (15.2%) were part-time, and 30 (2.8%) were unemployed.

Education

References

Populated places in Waikato
Hauraki District